With the establishment of Syro Malabar eparchies of Shamshabad and Hosur in October 2017, the Catholic Church in India includes 174 dioceses, of which 132 are Roman, 31 are Syro-Malabar, and 11 are Syro-Malankara. These are organised into 29 ecclesiastical provinces, comprising 23 Latin, 4 Syro-Malabar and 2 Syro-Malankara provinces.

The bishops of the Latin Catholic Church, Syro-Malabar Catholic Church and Syro-Malankara Catholic Church form the Catholic Bishops' Conference of India (CBCI). This episcopal conference was established in 1944.

Latin Catholic Ecclesiastical Provinces

Province of Agra
 Metropolitan Archdiocese of Agra
 Diocese of Ajmer
 Diocese of Allahabad
 Diocese of Bareilly
 Diocese of Bijnor (Syro-Malabar)
 Diocese of Gorakhpur (Syro-Malabar)
 Diocese of Jaipur
 Diocese of Jhansi
 Diocese of Lucknow
 Diocese of Meerut
 Diocese of Udaipur
 Diocese of Varanasi

Province of Bangalore
 Metropolitan Archdiocese of Bangalore
 Diocese of Belgaum
 Diocese of Bellary
 Diocese of Chikmagalur
 Diocese of Gulbarga
 Diocese of Karwar
 Diocese of Mangalore
 Diocese of Mysore
 Diocese of Shimoga
 Diocese of Udupi

Province of Bhopal
Metropolitan Archdiocese of Bhopal
 Diocese of Gwalior
 Diocese of Indore
 Diocese of Jabalpur
 Diocese of Jhabua
 Diocese of Khandwa
 Diocese of Sagar (Syro-Malabar)
 Diocese of Satna (Syro-Malabar)
 Diocese of Ujjain (Syro-Malabar)

Province of Bombay
Metropolitan Archdiocese of Bombay
 Diocese of Poona
 Diocese of Vasai
 Diocese of Nashik
 Diocese of Kalyan (Syro-Malabar)

Province of Calcutta
Metropolitan Archdiocese of Calcutta
 Diocese of Asansol
 Diocese of Bagdogra
 Diocese of Baruipur
 Diocese of Darjeeling
 Diocese of Jalpaiguri
 Diocese of Krishnagar
 Diocese of Raiganj

Province of Cuttack-Bhubaneswar
Metropolitan Archdiocese of Cuttack-Bhubaneswar
 Diocese of Balasore
 Diocese of Berhampur
 Diocese of Rayagada
 Diocese of Rourkela
 Diocese of Sambalpur

Province of Delhi
Metropolitan Archdiocese of Delhi
 Diocese of Jammu-Srinagar
 Diocese of Jalandhar
 Diocese of Simla and Chandigarh

Province of Gandhinagar
Metropolitan Archdiocese of Gandhinagar
 Diocese of Ahmedabad
 Diocese of Baroda
 Diocese of Rajkot (Syro-Malabar)

Province of Goa and Daman
Metropolitan Archdiocese of Goa and Daman
 Diocese of Sindhudurg

Province of Guwahati
Metropolitan Archdiocese of Guwahati
 Diocese of Bongaigaon
 Diocese of Dibrugarh
 Diocese of Diphu
 Diocese of Itanagar
 Diocese of Miao
 Diocese of Tezpur

Province of Hyderabad
Metropolitan Archdiocese of Hyderabad
 Diocese of Adilabad (Syro-Malabar)
 Diocese of Cuddapah
 Diocese of Khammam
 Diocese of Kurnool
 Diocese of Nalgonda
 Diocese of Warangal

Province of Imphal
Metropolitan Archdiocese of Imphal
 Diocese of Kohima

Province of Madras and Mylapore
Metropolitan Archdiocese of Madras and Mylapore
 Diocese of Chingleput
 Diocese of Coimbatore
 Diocese of Ootacamund
 Diocese of Vellore

Province of Madurai
Metropolitan Metropolitan Archdiocese of Madurai
 Diocese of Dindigul
 Diocese of Kottar
 Diocese of Kuzhithurai
 Diocese of Palayamkottai
 Diocese of Sivagangai
 Diocese of Tiruchirapalli
 Diocese of Tuticorin

Province of Nagpur
Metropolitan Archdiocese of Nagpur
 Diocese of Amravati
 Diocese of Aurangabad
 Diocese of Chanda (Syro-Malabar)

Province of Patna
Metropolitan Archdiocese of Patna
 Diocese of Bettiah
 Diocese of Bhagalpur
 Diocese of Buxar
 Diocese of Muzaffarpur
 Diocese of Purnea

Province of Pondicherry and Cuddalore
Archdiocese of Pondicherry and Cuddalore
Diocese of Dharmapuri
Diocese of Kumbakonam
Diocese of Salem
Diocese of Tanjore

Province of Raipur
Metropolitan Archdiocese of Raipur
 Diocese of Ambikapur
 Diocese of Jagdalpur (Syro-Malabar)
 Diocese of Jashpur
 Diocese of Raigarh

Province of Ranchi
Metropolitan Archdiocese of Ranchi
 Diocese of Daltonganj
 Diocese of Dumka
 Diocese of Gumla
 Diocese of Hazaribag
 Diocese of Jamshedpur
 Diocese of Khunti
 Diocese of Port Blair
 Diocese of Simdega

Province of Shillong
Metropolitan Archdiocese of Shillong
 Diocese of Agartala
 Diocese of Aizawl
 Diocese of Jowai
 Diocese of Nongstoin
 Diocese of Tura

Province of Trivandrum
 Metropolitan Archdiocese of Trivandrum
 Diocese of Alleppey
 Diocese of Neyyattinkara
 Diocese of Punalur
 Diocese of Quilon

Province of Verapoly
 Metropolitan Archdiocese of Verapoly
 Diocese of Calicut
 Diocese of Cochin
 Diocese of Kannur
 Diocese of Kottapuram
 Diocese of Sultanpet
 Diocese of Vijayapuram

Province of Visakhapatnam
Metropolitan Archdiocese of Visakhapatnam
 Diocese of Eluru
 Diocese of Guntur
 Diocese of Nellore
 Diocese of Srikakulam
 Diocese of Vijayawada

Syro-Malabar Catholic Ecclesiastical Provinces
The Syro-Malabar Church is governed by the Major Archbishop whose seat is Ernakulam-Angamaly and the synod of all bishops of this sui iuris church, both within and outside of India.

Province of Ernakulam - Angamaly
Syro-Malabar Catholic Major Archeparchy of Ernakulam-Angamaly
Syro-Malabar Catholic Diocese of Idukki
Syro-Malabar Catholic Diocese of Kothamangalam

Province of Changanassery
Syro-Malabar Catholic Archdiocese of Changanassery
Syro-Malabar Catholic Diocese of Kanjirappally
Syro-Malabar Catholic Diocese of Palai
Syro-Malabar Catholic Diocese of Thuckalay

Province of Tellicherry
Syro-Malabar Catholic Archdiocese of Tellicherry
Syro-Malabar Catholic Diocese of Belthangady
Syro-Malabar Catholic Diocese of Bhadravathi
Syro-Malabar Catholic Diocese of Mananthavady
Syro-Malabar Catholic Diocese of Thamarassery
Syro-Malabar Catholic Diocese of Mandya

Province of Thrissur
Syro-Malabar Catholic Archdiocese of Thrissur
Syro-Malabar Catholic Diocese of Ramanathapuram
Syro-Malabar Catholic Diocese of Irinjalakuda
Syro-Malabar Catholic Diocese of Palghat

Archdiocese of Kottayam
 Syro-Malabar Catholic Archdiocese of Kottayam

Directly under the Holy See 

 Syro-Malabar Catholic Diocese of Faridabad
 Syro-Malabar Catholic Diocese of Hosur
 Syro-Malabar Catholic Diocese of Shamshabad

Syro-Malankara Catholic Ecclesiastical Provinces
The Syro-Malankara Catholic Church is also a major archiepiscopal sui iuris Church. It is governed by the Major Archbishop whose seat is Trivandrum and its synod of bishops.

Province of Trivandrum
Syro-Malankara Catholic Major Archeparchy of Trivandrum
Syro-Malankara Catholic Eparchy of Marthandom
Syro-Malankara Catholic Eparchy of Mavelikara
Syro-Malankara Catholic Eparchy of Parassala
Syro-Malankara Catholic Eparchy of Pathanamthitta

Province of Tiruvalla
Syro-Malankara Catholic Archeparchy of Tiruvalla
Syro-Malankara Catholic Eparchy of Muvattupuzha
Syro-Malankara Catholic Eparchy of Bathery
Syro-Malankara Catholic Eparchy of Puthur

Directly under the Synod of the Syro-Malankara Church
Syro-Malankara Catholic Apostolic Exarchate of St. Ephrem of Khadki

Directly under the Holy See
Syro-Malankara Catholic Eparchy of St. John Chrysostom of Gurgaon

See also
 Catholic Church in India
 Territories of Roman Catholic dioceses in India
 Christianity in India
 List of cathedrals in India
 List of Catholic bishops of India
 List of Catholic dioceses (structured view)

Notes

External links 
Current Dioceses in India
Catholic-Hierarchy entry.
GCatholic.org.

References

 
India
Roman Catholic dioceses